The Walter and Anna Zion Homestead near Idalia, Colorado dates from 1910.  It includes sod house architecture.  The main house, a "soddy," was built in 1910 by Walter Zion and others.  The homestead was listed on the National Register of Historic Places in 2005.  The listing included eight contributing buildings, two other contributing structures, and one contributing site in an  area.

References

Farms on the National Register of Historic Places in Colorado
Buildings and structures completed in 1910
Yuma County, Colorado
Sod houses
Historic districts on the National Register of Historic Places in Colorado
National Register of Historic Places in Yuma County, Colorado